State of War is a real-time strategy game, developed by Cypron Studios and Cinemax and published by Crystal Interactive in 2001.
Classic versions of State of War and State of War: Warmonger were released in December 2018 on Steam.

Story 
This description is told by narrator at the beginning of the game.

After centuries of continuous struggles, war and turmoil; humankind finally came together and founded the United Federation of Seven Continents (UFSC). It was decided that every member of the Federation would provide their armed forces to build a single military unit with the goal to protect the Earth and settle eventual conflicts. Thus it was no longer possible for any individual group to use military force to resolve their personal aim.

Within several years, the Federation created a Global Defense Network, known as "Overmind". Actually, it was a super intelligent mainframe computer - a unique work of hundreds of the most gifted scientists on the planet. It was operated by an intelligent software and consisted of 22 military bases worldwide located far from populated areas ready to act in case of the conflict. Since then, no machinery was ever controlled by man. Only the formal approval to activate "Overmind" had to be given by each UFSC representative.

Global society, however, carried its burdens. People suffering from spiritual emptiness sought refuge in organizations that offered salvation. The most influential among them was the Beho-Sunns. Charismatic leaders of the cult used their personal charm and rhetorical skills to attract more and more people. Their audience included every social group from workers, scienties, lawyers to elite politicians. Behind it all, there was the wicked plan to get hold of "Overmind". None of the Beho-Sunns followers knew that during their meditation seasons the cult gathered all kinds of information from their minds. Over years, the Beho-Sunns discovered much about Overmind's mechanics and were able to hack the software which controls Overmind.

It so happened that the Beho-Sunns leaders tried to hack Overmind, but due to sophisticated firewall protection, they failed. Consequences were fatal. The Global Defense System went out of order and malfunctioned. Members of the Beho-Sunns quickly recovered from their defeat and started occupying defenseless military bases. Their actions must be halted! To do so, the UFSC have declared a state of war.

Sequels
A sequel titled State of War: Warmonger was released. Designed as a stand-alone version, the game includes 16 new missions in which 11 are single-player and 5 multiplayer.

In 2007 a sequel titled State of War 2: Arcon was released in the Czech Republic, Slovakia and Russia.

In 2008 a Nintendo DS game titled Command and Destroy was released featuring similar visual and real-time strategy design. It was met with mixed reception from critics and GameZone'''s review stated that is a "half-decent effort that doesn't live up to the legacy created by the game it mimics", referencing the similarly titled Command & Conquer''.

References

External links 
About State of War game
State of War in Cypronia  official link
State of War Game Theme Website - Chinese Website

2001 video games
Real-time strategy video games
Science fiction video games
Multiplayer and single-player video games
Windows games
Windows-only games
Video games developed in Slovakia
Video games developed in the Czech Republic
Cypronia games
Video games about cults